The dorsal carpometacarpal ligaments, the strongest and most distinct carpometacarpal ligaments, connect the carpal and metacarpal bones on their dorsal surfaces.

 The second metacarpal bone receives two fasciculi, one from the greater, the other from the lesser multangular.
 The third metacarpal receives two, one each from the lesser multangular and capitate.
 The fourth two, one each from the capitate and hamate.
 The fifth receives a single fasciculus from the hamate, and this is continuous with a similar ligament on the volar surface, forming an incomplete capsule.

References

External links
 

Ligaments of the upper limb